Richard Josiah Hinton (November 26, 1830 – December 20, 1901) was a journalist, author, abolitionist, and military officer with the rank of colonel. He was the commander of African-American soldiers in the American Civil War, Freedmens Bureau official, and U.S. government official.

Born in England, he came to the United States in 1851, and became an important witness to events leading to the Civil War and its aftermath. He was an abolitionist who moved to Kansas in 1856 to help stop the spread of slavery. During the Civil War he helped recruit units of the new United States Colored Troops, and served as an officer of one (all the officers were white). He wrote about Abraham Lincoln, John Brown, and poet Richard Realf.

He reported from Haiti for James Redpath's Pine and Palm newspaper. He served as an officer with the 1st Kansas Colored Infantry Regiment in 1862 and then as captain of Company B, 2nd Kansas Colored Infantry Regiment. (All the "colored" regiments had white officers.) He subsequently served in various federal government positions: United States Commissioner of Emigration in Europe in 1867; inspector of U.S. consulates in Europe; special agent to President Ulysses S. Grant to Vienna in 1873; special agent to the Departments of Treasury and State on the frontier and in Mexico in 1883; irrigation engineer to the U.S. Geological Survey from 1889-1890; and special agent in charge of the U.S. Department of Agriculture from 1890 to 1892. In 1900 he wrote "I am glad also I was able to do other work, both as writer and fighter, in a small way, and, among Kansas soldiers, and many others by far more important than myself, to make the union secure and the whole of the state free from the curse of chattelism."

He was survived by his wife Isabella H. Hinton, and two sons, George F. and Ralph Hinton. The Kansas Historical Society has a collection of his papers.

Publications (chronologically)

'
 
 

 (With Frank A. Burr) 
 
 
  In 1899 he published a summary.
 
 Contains a 14-page introduction on Hinton, by William E. Connelley.

References

External links
Findagrave entry

1830 births
1901 deaths